Macizo de Anaga is a mountain range in the northeastern part of the island of Tenerife in the Canary Islands. The highest point is 1,024 m (Cruz de Taborno). It stretches from the Punta de Anaga in the northeast to Cruz del Carmen in the southwest. Anaga features the mountain peaks of Bichuelo, Anambro, Chinobre, Pico Limante, Cruz de Taborno and Cruz del Carmen. The mountains were formed by a volcanic eruption about 7 to 9 million years ago making it the oldest part of the island. Since 1987 it has been protected as a "natural park", reclassified as "rural park" in 1994. Since 2015 it is also an UNESCO Biosphere Reserve and is the place that has the largest number of endemic species in Europe.

It is a remote and wild area characterized by humid forests, such as laurisilva. Native plant species include Ceropegia dichotoma, Ceropegia fusca and Echium virescens. The Macizo de Anaga is also rich in archaeological finds, among which is the Mummy of San Andrés belonging to the ancient Guanche.
The main villages in the Macizo de Anaga are San Andrés, Taganana and Igueste de San Andrés. A place in the mountains known as El Bailadero is believed to have been a place where witches were practicing witchcraft and dancing around a bonfire.

See also 
Roques de Anaga
Punta de Anaga Lighthouse
Witches of Anaga

References

External links

Flora of Anaga
El Bailadero of the witches.

Protected areas of Tenerife
Witchcraft in Spain
Mountains of the Canary Islands
Biosphere reserves of Spain